Louis (Lodewijk) Benoît D'Haeseleer (20 October 1911 – 12 August 1988) was a Belgian clerk and liberal politician.

He was the president-founder of the Liberale Sociale Werken of Aalst. He was alderman and burgomaster of Aalst, member of the provincial council of East Flanders, a member of the Belgian parliament, and president of the Liberaal Vlaams Verbond (1966–1967).

Sources
 Louis D'Haeseleer
 G. Coppens, G. Van den Eede, De geschiedenis van de Liberale Partij te Aalst 1846-2002, Aalst, Gaston Van den Eede, 2003, p. 71-97, 179–180.

1911 births
1988 deaths
Flemish politicians
Flemish activists